Talmo is a rural locality in the north eastern part of the Riverina.  It is situated by road, about 12 kilometres south of Bookham and 24 kilometres east of Jugiong.

Notes and references

Towns in the Riverina
Towns in New South Wales